Colicăuți is a commune in Briceni District, Moldova. It is composed of two villages, Colicăuți and Trestieni.

References

Communes of Briceni District